Faalavelvae Matagi (born 13 March 1997)  is a Samoan footballer who plays as a goalkeeper for Lupe ole Soaga in the Samoa National League and the Samoa national football team.

Matagi grew up playing rugby, but switched to soccer at the age of 15 when his school team needed a goalkeeper. He was selected for the Samoa national football team for the 2016 OFC Nations Cup. He captained the Samoa national under-20 football team in the 2016 OFC U-20 Championship. In June 2019 he was named to the squad for the 2019 Pacific Games.

In 2017 he was part of the Lupe o le Soaga team contesting the 2017 OFC Champions League.

He works as the Goalkeeping Development Officer for Football Federation Samoa.

References

External links
 

Living people
1997 births
Samoan footballers
Kiwi FC players
Association football goalkeepers
Samoa under-20 international footballers
Samoa international footballers
Sportspeople from Apia
2016 OFC Nations Cup players
Samoa youth international footballers